Joshua Crittenden Cody (June 11, 1892 – June 17, 1961) was an American college athlete, head coach, and athletics director. Cody was a native of Tennessee and an alumnus of Vanderbilt University, where he played several sports. As a versatile tackle on the football team, he was a three-time All-American. In 1969, Cody was named by the Football Writers Association of America to the 1869–1918 Early Era All-American Team. He was inducted as a player into the College Football Hall of Fame in 1970. Coach Charley Moran called Cody the greatest tackle ever to play in the South.

After graduation from Vanderbilt, Cody coached college football and basketball and served as the athletics director at various universities, including: Clemson University, the University of Florida and Temple University. He also was an assistant for head football coaches Dan McGugin and Ray Morrison at Vanderbilt.

Early life and education 

Josh Cody was born in Franklin, Tennessee, on June 11, 1892, to James Wadkins Cody, a painter, and Sarah Elizabeth Crittenden. He was raised in Franklin and attended Battle Ground Academy.

College career
Cody first played three seasons at Bethel College—now known as Bethel College in Russellville, Kentucky, including the 105–0 loss to Vanderbilt in 1912.

Vanderbilt University
In 1914, at the age of 22, he enrolled at Vanderbilt University and was a member of the football, basketball, baseball, and track and field teams, earning a total of thirteen varsity letters. One source called Cody: "the interference-smashingest, goal-cageingest, home-run knockingest, super-athlete in all Dixie." Nashville Banner sportswriter and Vanderbilt alumnus Fred Russell described Cody: "When I think of Josh in his college days, I get a mental picture of this great big fellow playing catcher in the spring between innings running out beyond the outfield to throw the shot or the discus in his baseball uniform. He was unbelievably skilled and nimble for a big man in basketball, and in football where he's a legend."

Football
Cody played for legendary coach Dan McGugin's football team as an offensive and defensive tackle (teams played one-platoon football in those days), but was versatile enough to play quarterback, running back, and kicker at times. Fuzzy Woodruff described Cody as "a great kicker and a tower of strength on offense."

McGugin later selected him as one of the six best players he ever coached. He was known as a sure tackler, and fierce blocker, who helped the Commodores score 1,099 points in thirty-five games (31.4 points per game). Vanderbilt was 23–9–1 in his four seasons, including 21–3–3 in his final three years. Cody was selected to at least one All-Southern team every year he played, and for an All-time Vanderbilt team published in its 1934 yearbook. Charley Moran called Cody the greatest tackle ever to play in the South.

Journalist Ralph McGill, once a teammate of Cody's, said: He was a great big fellow and one of the most seriously dedicated fellows I've ever met. He was a farm boy and he didn't have any polish but he was very honest and sincere. He didn't have scholarship—we had none in those days— but he had a real job. He literally cleaned the gymnasium every day, cleaned up the locker rooms and the showers, and tended to the coal furnace after practice. He was a big man, squarely built, quiet, almost shy, and enormously decent. He practiced long hours to place kick and became the team's place kicker. He wasn't fast, but he was fast for a big man. He didn't like to wear pads. He got a hold of an old quilt and sewed it to the shoulders of the jersey and that was all the padding he wore.

1914
In Cody's freshman year of 1914, Vanderbilt returned only ten men with experience  and finished with a 2–6 record, McGugin's first losing season, and only the second losing season in the school's twenty-five years of playing football.

In his second game, a 23–3 loss to Michigan in Ann Arbor, Cody converted a 45-yard (41.148 m) drop kick field goal. At one point he also fell on Michigan's Tommy Hughitt while both dove after a fumble. Though the referees did not call roughing, Michigan was bitter about the lack of a call throughout the game, and shortly after even threatened to end the contest between the two schools.  In his fifth game, a 20–7 loss to Virginia, Cody dropped back into the backfield and threw a touchdown pass to Irby "Rabbit" Curry, the team's regular quarterback. Cody received his first national honor at season's end from Outing magazine's Football Roll of Honor.

1915
In 1915, Vanderbilt finished with a 9–1 record and a Southern Intercollegiate Athletic Association (SIAA) championship. Cody earned his second national honor – a third team, All-America selection from Walter Camp.  The "point-a-minute" Commodores outscored their opponents by an incredible 514–38. Their only loss was a 35–10 setback to Virginia — a game in which Cody drop kicked a 20-yard field goal.

Cody personally took over the Auburn game after Vanderbilt was up 17–0. In one of the greatest exhibitions of punt covering, Cody smothered the receiver every time, recovering two fumbles, including one across the goal line for a touchdown. Then, in the last ten seconds of play, Cody dropped kicked a three-pointer from the 33-yard line. In the season's final game against rival Sewanee, tackles Cody and Tom Lipscomb blocked a punt leading to the game's second touchdown. Irby Curry later had an 80-yard touchdown with Cody clearing the path. The final score was 28–3. Cody also received an offer to play for Navy.

1916–1918

In 1916, Cody helped Vanderbilt to a 7–1–1 record, and was selected All-Southern, but was not recognized as an All-American. The season started with a question over his eligibility due to formerly playing at Bethel, but was resolved.

World War I 
He was elected captain of next year's team at season's end, but instead served in the U.S. Army during World War I as a lieutenant in 1917 and 1918. Cody played football during the war at Camp Jackson.

1919
Cody then returned to Vanderbilt for his senior year in 1919.  Cody again starred in the Auburn game, giving the SIAA champion its only loss on the year with a 15-yard fumble return and extra point to win 7–6. The Commodores finished 5–1–2, and Cody was named an All-American for the third time, as he  again earned a third-team selection by Walter Camp; becoming the only Vanderbilt athlete to be named a three-time All-American.
He spurned an offer from the Canton Bulldogs to play professional football.

Basketball
Cody was a forward on the basketball teams coached by Ray Morrison. Tom Zerfoss and Cody were the starting forwards on the SIAA champion 1919–1920 team. As a senior, Cody won the Porter Cup as the school's best all-around athlete.

Coaching career

Mercer
After he graduated in 1920, he became the head coach of all sports and athletic director at Mercer. In 1922, Mercer's team was crippled, having many star players out with dengue fever. Former Georgia Tech running back Everett Strupper was an assistant coach. The basketball team was led by George Harmon and won the SIAA as runner-up to North Carolina in the 1922 SoCon men's basketball tournament.

Vanderbilt

In 1923, he returned to Vanderbilt, where he became the head coach of the school's baseball and basketball teams. During that time, he also served as an assistant football coach to McGugin. Cody's first year as an assistant on the football team in 1923 saw the last conference title for Vanderbilt in the sport to date. In 1926, the football team lost only to Wade's Alabama.

His 1926–27 basketball team finished 20–4—the best record in school history—and won the Southern Conference tournament championship. Cody had a variety of superstitions while coaching his basketball team, including not laundering jerseys during a winning streak until a game was lost, and starting contests with the same lineup.

Clemson
From 1927 to 1930, he was the head coach of the Clemson basketball and football teams.  During his tenure, he compiled a 29–11–1 record as football coach, including a perfect 4–0 record against archrival South Carolina and a near-perfect 13–0–1 at home.  He was 48–55 as basketball coach. Cody was popular with the Clemson student body, who called him "Big Man" because of his large stature.

In 1927 he gave Red Sanders his first coaching job as backfield coach. In May 1929, when rumors were swirling that he might leave to coach a bigger-name program, the students, faculty, and staff took up a collection to buy him a brand new black Buick automobile. Raymond Johnson wrote upon Cody's death: "Josh Cody wanted to be Vanderbilt's coach so bad that he gave up the head man's job at Clemson College after four successful seasons."

Fred Russell had a well-known story of Cody during a chicken-eating contest at Clemson with Herman Stegeman, the coach at Georgia. "Josh weighed about 260 then. He outstripped Stegeman by eleven chickens. He wasn't satisfied just to win. He just went on to a decisive victory." As Cody explained: "I got two chickens ahead of him early and just coasted."

Vanderbilt again
In 1931, he returned to Vanderbilt as head coach of the basketball team and assistant football coach. In his second stint as Vanderbilt's basketball coach, Cody went 51–50. In 1934, when McGugin retired, Cody was passed over for the head coaching job in favor of former Vanderbilt quarterback and SMU coach Ray Morrison. Morrison brought his own staff from SMU and neglected Cody's coaching abilities, but Cody remained basketball coach through the 1935–1936 season. His Commodores basketball teams tallied 51–50 in five seasons.

Florida

Disappointed at being passed over for the Commodores' football head coaching job, Cody left Vanderbilt in 1936 and, with McGugin's help, was picked by Edgar Jones to become athletic director and head football coach at Florida, where he succeeded Dutch Stanley and compiled a poor 17–24–2 record in the four seasons from 1936 to 1939. Florida's lone All-SEC selection during this period was Walter "Tiger" Mayberry in 1937. The 1937 team defeated the Georgia Bulldogs in the two teams' annual rivalry game for the first time in eight years. In 1938, Cody lost at home to Pop Warner's Temple 20–12 in the last game Warner ever coached.

Perhaps Cody's finest moment as the Gators' head coach was the 7–0 upset of coach Frank Leahy's then-undefeated, second-ranked Boston College Eagles at Fenway Park in his final season. Sophomore end Fergie Ferguson, namesake of the Fergie Ferguson Award, was the defensive star of the game for the Gators.

Temple
In 1940, he left Florida and became the line coach under Ray Morrison at Temple. In 1942, he was appointed the head coach of the Temple basketball team. In 1944, he guided the Owls to their first NCAA tournament berth, reaching the Elite Eight. One of his clinics and games at Temple in 1947 drew several hundred players, coaches, and fans. He remained Temple's basketball coach until 1952—compiling a record of 124–103—and then became athletic director.

In 1955, after the sudden resignation of Albert Kawal, he served one year as Temple's head football coach, compiling an 0–8 record.

Retirement and death
In 1959, at the age of 67, he retired to his  farm across the Delaware River in Moorestown, New Jersey which mostly produced grain.  He died of a heart attack in Mount Laurel, New Jersey on June 17, 1961. Former Vanderbilt quarterback Tommy Henderson said after learning of Cody's death: Josh was one of my closest friends until he went to Temple. After that I'm afraid we lost contact. He had a lasting influence on the men who played for him. He was kind and considerate but demanding, too. He was a fine defensive basketball coach who believed in aggressive defensive fundamentals. In football, he was respected for what he knew and what he could do with his material."

Posthumous honors 

In 1969, Cody was named by the Football Writers Association of America (FWAA) to the 1869–1918 Early Era All-American Team (the only southern player chosen). The same year, he was also selected for an Associated Press Southeast Area All-Time football team 1869–1919 era.  He was elected to the College Football Hall of Fame in 1970 and the Tennessee Sports Hall of Fame in 1999.

Head coaching record

Football

Basketball

See also
 List of College Football Hall of Fame inductees (players, A–K)
 List of Vanderbilt University athletes

Notes

References

Bibliography

External links
 
 

1892 births
1961 deaths
American football drop kickers
American football tackles
American men's basketball players
Forwards (basketball)
Bethel Warriors football players
Clemson Tigers football coaches
Clemson Tigers men's basketball coaches
Florida Gators athletic directors
Florida Gators football coaches
Florida Gators men's basketball coaches
Mercer Bears athletic directors
Mercer Bears baseball coaches
Mercer Bears football coaches
Mercer Bears men's basketball coaches
Temple Owls athletic directors
Temple Owls football coaches
Temple Owls men's basketball coaches
Vanderbilt Commodores football coaches
Vanderbilt Commodores football players
Vanderbilt Commodores men's basketball coaches
Vanderbilt Commodores men's basketball players
College men's track and field athletes in the United States
All-American college football players
All-Southern college football players
College Football Hall of Fame inductees
United States Army personnel of World War I
People from Franklin, Tennessee
People from Moorestown, New Jersey
Coaches of American football from Tennessee
Players of American football from Tennessee
Baseball coaches from Tennessee
Basketball coaches from Tennessee
Basketball players from Tennessee